Beadle is a title.

Beadle may also refer to:

Places
 Beadle County, South Dakota
 Beadle Lake, lake and unincorporated community in Emmett Charter Township, Michigan

People with the surname
Al Beadle (1927–1998), American modernist architect
Chauncey Beadle (1866–1950), Canadian-American botanist and horticulturist
Erastus Flavel Beadle (1821–1894), American printer and publisher
George Beadle (1903–1989), American scientist in the field of genetics
Harry Beadles (1897–1958), Welsh football forward
Sir Hugh Beadle (1905–1980), Rhodesian lawyer, politician and judge
Jean Beadle (1868–1942), Australian feminist, social worker and Labor party member
Jeremy Beadle (1948–2008), English television presenter
Jeremy J. Beadle (1956–1995), English musicologist and broadcaster, unrelated to the above
Michelle Beadle (born 1975), American sports reporter and host
Peter Beadle (born 1972), English football forward and manager
Thomas Beadle (born 1987), American politician
William H. H. Beadle (1838–1915) American soldier, lawyer, educator and administrator

See also 
 Beadles
 Beedle
 Bedel (disambiguation)
 Bedell (disambiguation)
 Esquire Bedell